Vikentije or Vićentije is the Serbian variant of the Latin name Vincentius, meaning "winner" or "conqueror".

Serbian Patriarch Vikentije I, Archbishop of Peć and Serbian Patriarch (1758)
Serbian Patriarch Vikentije II, Archbishop of Peć and Serbian Patriarch (1950–1958)
Vikentije Popović, Metropolitan of Karlovci (1713–1725)
Vikentije Jovanović, Metropolitan of Belgrade and Karlovci (1731–1737)
Vićentije Jovanović Vidak, Metropolitan of Sremski Karlovci (1774–1780)
Vićentije Vićenco Vuković ( 1560–71), Serbian printer and editor in Venice

See also
Vićentijević

Serbian masculine given names